Raj Niwas (translation: Government House) is the official residence of the Lieutenant Governor of Delhi, the head of state of Delhi and Government of National Capital Territory of Delhi. It is located on Raj Niwas Marg, Civil Lines, Delhi. The present lieutenant governor of Delhi is Vinai Kumar Saxena, since May 23, 2022.

In 1911, when Delhi became the National Capital Territory, it was the residence of Chief Commissioner of Delhi.

History 

The area in which Raj Niwas is located has been playing an important part in the administrative history of Delhi for over 175 years. It  lay just north of the 17th century city of Shahjahanabad, adjoining the Mughal garden known as Qudsia Bagh.
After the British East India Company established their  administrative control over Delhi in 1803, slowly a few large British houses  came up here.  

In 1844 Ludlow Castle became the residence of the then-highest official in Delhi – the Commissioner and Agent to the Governor General.

In the decades after the Revolt of 1857, more bungalows were built in this area, leading to the creation of Civil Lines.  The road came to be known as Ludlow Castle Road.  Ludlow Castle was occupied in the late 19th century by the Delhi Club, and later by a school.  The Chief Commissioner of Delhi moved to a smaller bunglow.

See also
 List of official residences of India

References

External links
 Lieutenant Governor of Delhi, Official website

Governors' houses in India
Government buildings in Delhi